Mukotorikon (婿取婚 むことりこん）refers to a system of uxorilocal marital structure in Japan, particularly in Japan's medieval period which was largely superseded by a system of patrilocal marriage, as some men became in charge of units ie or za following changes in society such as the  decline of the ritsuryo system.

See also 
Marriage in Japan

References 

Types of marriage